Cascade Lakes Brewing Company is a brewery founded in 1994 in Redmond, Oregon, United States.  Steady expansion in the Central Oregon area has seen the company opening two locations throughout the region, with a third planned for SE Bend.
Their brews include:
 Rooster Tail Ale (golden ale)
 Monkey Face Porter (porter)
 Angus MacDougals (Scottish ale)
 I.P.A. (India pale ale)
 Pine Marten Pale Ale
 20" Brown (brown ale)
 Blonde Bombshell

The brewery also produces several seasonal beers.

Cascades Lakes Brewing Company is Central Oregon's only not-for-profit brewery.

See also

 Beer in the United States
 Brewing in Oregon

References

 McKenzie, Madeline (June 15, 2008) "Bend's brew pubs cure what ales you." The Seattle Times.

External links
Company Website

Privately held companies based in Oregon
Beer brewing companies based in Oregon
Redmond, Oregon
1994 establishments in Oregon